Agustín Álvarez Martínez (born 19 May 2001) is a Uruguayan professional footballer who plays as a forward for Serie A club Sassuolo and the Uruguay national team.

Club career
A youth academy graduate of Peñarol, Álvarez made his professional debut on 13 September 2020 in goalless draw against Montevideo City Torque. He scored his first goal on 19 September 2020 in a 3–1 league win against Plaza Colonia.

On 17 June 2022, Álvarez joined Serie A club Sassuolo on a five-year deal.

International career
Álvarez is a former Uruguay youth international. On 29 August 2021, he received his first call-up to senior team for FIFA World Cup qualifiers. He made his debut on 5 September 2021 by scoring a goal in a 4–2 win against Bolivia. On 21 October 2022, he was named in Uruguay's 55-man preliminary squad for the 2022 FIFA World Cup.

Career statistics

Club

International

Scores and results list Uruguay's goal tally first, score column indicates score after each Álvarez goal.

Honours
Peñarol
 Uruguayan Primera División: 2021
 Supercopa Uruguaya: 2022

Individual
 Uruguayan Primera División Young Player of the Year: 2021
 Uruguayan Primera División Team of the Year: 2021
 Copa Sudamericana top scorer: 2021

References

External links
 

2001 births
Living people
Association football forwards
Uruguayan footballers
Uruguay international footballers
Uruguayan Primera División players
Serie A players
Peñarol players
U.S. Sassuolo Calcio players
Uruguayan expatriate footballers
Uruguayan expatriate sportspeople in Italy
Expatriate footballers in Italy